Mashkan is a village in West Azerbaijan Province, Iran.

Mashkan may also refer to:
Mashkan-shapir, Iraq
Maskan, Iran
Meshkat, Iran